Saleem Farooqi (born 5 August 1940) is a former Pakistani cyclist. He competed in four events at the 1956 Summer Olympics.

References

External links
 

1940 births
Living people
Pakistani male cyclists
Olympic cyclists of Pakistan
Cyclists at the 1956 Summer Olympics
Place of birth missing (living people)
Asian Games medalists in cycling
Cyclists at the 1958 Asian Games
Medalists at the 1958 Asian Games
Asian Games silver medalists for Pakistan
20th-century Pakistani people